Dunsford Aerodrome  is an aerodrome adjacent to Dunsford, Ontario, Canada.

References

Registered aerodromes in Ontario
Buildings and structures in Kawartha Lakes